Ipum of Geumgwan Gaya (died 407) (r. 346–407) was the fifth ruler of Geumgwan Gaya, a Gaya state of ancient Korea.  He was the son of King Geojilmi and Queen Aji.

Family
Father: King Geojilmi (거질미왕, 居叱彌王)
Mother: Lady Aji (아지부인, 阿志夫人)
Wife: Lady Jeongsin (정신부인, 貞信夫人)
Son: King Jwaji (좌지왕, 坐知王)

See also 
 List of Korean monarchs
 History of Korea
 Gaya confederacy
 Three Kingdoms of Korea

Notes

References 

Gaya rulers
407 deaths
4th-century monarchs in Asia
5th-century monarchs in Asia
Year of birth unknown